INS Taragiri (F41) was a  of the Indian Navy. Taragiri was commissioned into the Navy on 16 May 1980 and was decommissioned on 27 June 2013 in Mumbai, after serving 33 years in the navy.

History 
INS Taragiri was the final ship of the Nilgiri class, and was named after a hill range in the Garhwal Himalaya. Cdr. Rahul Shankar was the 27th and last commanding officer of the frigate. A Westland Sea King anti-submarine helicopter, A244S 321 mm triple torpedo tubes and a Bofors anti-submarine twin barrel mortar were added. Later, she was also fitted with advanced ship control systems for controlling unmanned aerial vehicles. These modifications gave the ship enhanced anti-submarine and network-centric warfare capabilities. She was operational under the Western Naval Fleet of the navy and performed surveillance missions when on blue water operations, and later performed coastal patrolling and anti-piracy operations.

References

Nilgiri-class frigates
Frigates of the Indian Navy
1976 ships